

Provincial leaders who became Federal MPs

Premiers of Canadian provinces since Canadian confederation who have subsequently been elected to the House of Commons of Canada.

 Dave Barrett - British Columbia
 Andrew George Blair - New Brunswick
 Edward Blake - Ontario
 John Bracken - Manitoba
 Bennett Campbell - Prince Edward Island
 Joseph-Adolphe Chapleau - Quebec 
 Amor De Cosmos - British Columbia
 Louis Henry Davies - Prince Edward Island
 Ujjal Dosanjh - British Columbia
 Tommy Douglas - Saskatchewan 
 George A. Drew - Ontario
 Charles Avery Dunning- Saskatchewan
 Henry Emmerson - New Brunswick
 Donald Farquharson - Prince Edward Island
 William Stevens Fielding - Nova Scotia
 Hugh John Flemming - New Brunswick
 James Kidd Flemming - New Brunswick
 James Garfield Gardiner - Saskatchewan
 Stuart Garson - Manitoba
 Lomer Gouin - Quebec
 Thomas Greenway - Manitoba
 John Douglas Hazen - New Brunswick
 Henri-Gustave Joly de Lotbinière - Quebec
 Angus Lewis Macdonald - Nova Scotia
 John Sandfield Macdonald - Ontario
 Peter Mitchell - New Brunswick
 James Colledge Pope - Prince Edward Island
 William Pugsley - New Brunswick
 Bob Rae - Ontario
 Gerald Regan - Nova Scotia
 Edgar Nelson Rhodes - Nova Scotia
 Arthur Lewis Sifton - Alberta
 Robert Stanfield - Nova Scotia
 Charles Stewart - Alberta
 John Sparrow David Thompson - Nova Scotia
 Brian Tobin - Newfoundland and Labrador 
 Simon Fraser Tolmie - British Columbia
 Charles Tupper - Nova Scotia
 Alexander Warburton - Prince Edward Island
 Peter Veniot - New Brunswick

Federal Members of Parliament who became Provincial leaders

These Canadian Federal MPs subsequently were elected as Provincial Premiers.

John B. M. Baxter - New Brunswick
John Howatt Bell - Prince Edward Island
Pat Binns - Prince Edward Island
Lucien Bouchard - Quebec
Catherine Callbeck - Prince Edward Island
Joseph-Adolphe Chapleau - Quebec
Jean Charest - Quebec
Amor De Cosmos - British Columbia
Tommy Douglas - Saskatchewan
Thomas Greenway - Manitoba
John Douglas Hazen - New Brunswick
Mitchell Hepburn - Ontario
Jason Kenney - Alberta
Henri-Gustave Joly de Lotbinière - Quebec
Jean Lesage - Quebec
Hugh John Macdonald - Manitoba
John Sandfield Macdonald - Ontario
Russell MacLellan - Nova Scotia
J. Angus MacLean - Prince Edward Island
Joseph Martin - British Columbia
William Melville Martin - Saskatchewan
Frank Moores - Newfoundland and Labrador
Joseph-Alfred Mousseau - Quebec
Brian Pallister - Manitoba
Jim Prentice - Alberta
Edward Gawler Prior - British Columbia
Gerald Regan - Nova Scotia
Bob Rae - Ontario
Edgar Nelson Rhodes - Nova Scotia
John Jones Ross - Quebec
George William Ross - Ontario
Edward Schreyer - Manitoba
Thomas Walter Scott - Saskatchewan
Brian Tobin - Newfoundland and Labrador
Simon Fraser Tolmie - British Columbia

See also

List of prime ministers of Canada

Lists of Canadian politicians
Canadian first ministers
Lists of Members of the House of Commons of Canada